Liocarcinus navigator is a species of crab in the family Portunidae.

Distribution
This species is found chiefly around the British Isles; its range covers the north-east Atlantic Ocean, including the North Sea as far north as Trøndelag in Norway, and as far south as Mauritania, and it also occurs in the Mediterranean Sea.

Description
The frontal margin of the carapace, between the eyes, has a fringe of hair but no spines.

Subspecies
Two subspecies are recognised:
Liocarcinus navigator rondeletii (Risso, 1816)
Liocarcinus navigator navigator (Herbst, 1794)

References

Further reading

Portunoidea
Crustaceans of the Atlantic Ocean
Fauna of the Mediterranean Sea
Crustaceans described in 1794
Taxa named by Johann Friedrich Wilhelm Herbst